Daniel Shaver (June 6, 1950 – January 2, 2007) was an American professional stock car racing driver. He drove in two NASCAR Busch Series races in 2002, and was a frequent driver in both ARCA and the Sports Car Club of America (SCCA).

Racing career
Shaver began racing in 1992, and when he did so, he founded his own team, Shaver Motorsports. He competed in ARCA, SCCA, and the NASCAR Busch Series, usually driving the No. 49 car and owning the No. 2 ride in ARCA. In 2006, Shaver retired from driving but continued to be an owner in ARCA, where he partnered with Joe Gibbs Racing to field their developmental drivers Denny Hamlin and Aric Almirola. Todd Bodine and Justin Marks were other notable drivers who drove for Shaver's ARCA team.

Personal life and death
Shaver graduated from South Mecklenburg High School, attended Central Piedmont Community College, and served in the United States Army Reserve.

In 1979, Shaver started a wholesale petroleum distribution company called Carolina Petroleum Distributors and also served as its CEO. The company grew from a statewide to a regional distributor. Shaver also owned a chain of convenience stores called Petro Express, which was his sponsor in nearly all of his NASCAR and ARCA starts.

He died of cancer on January 2, 2007, at the age of 56.

Motorsports career results

NASCAR
(key) (Bold – Pole position awarded by qualifying time. Italics – Pole position earned by points standings or practice time. * – Most laps led.)

Busch Series

ARCA Re/Max Series
(key) (Bold – Pole position awarded by qualifying time. Italics – Pole position earned by points standings or practice time. * – Most laps led.)

References

External links
 

1950 births
2007 deaths
ARCA Menards Series drivers
Deaths from cancer
NASCAR drivers
Racing drivers from Charlotte, North Carolina